Faverolles is a commune in the Somme department in Hauts-de-France in northern France.

Geography
Faverolles is on the D930 road, some 32 km (20 mi) southeast of Amiens.

Places of interest
 Church of Saint Marie
 War memorial

Population

See also
Communes of the Somme department

References

Communes of Somme (department)